Mohamad Hafez (born 1984) is a Syrian-American artist and architect living in the United States. His work primarily explores around the stories and dislocation of Syrian refugees.

Early life
Hafez was born in 1984 in Syria. He emigrated to the United States in 2003, on a visa to study architecture at the University of Iowa.

Work
Hafez is best known for his miniature diorama works, which depict daily life in Syria, which he has been creating since 2004. His 2017 work Unpacked: Refugee Baggage is a series of miniature dioramas based on interviews that conducted with refugees from the Syrian war. It is intended to humanize the refugee subjects.

In 2021, The New Yorker produced a short film on Hafez's work, directed by Jimmy Goldblum and titled A Broken House. The film later aired on the PBS series POV during the POV Shorts installment "Where I'm From."

Selected solo exhibitions
 2016 Refugees: Stories of Life's Dreams and Scars - Yale University, New Haven, Connecticut
 2016 Unsettled Nostalgia - The Harts Gallery, New Milford, Connecticut
 2016 Desperate Cargo - Real Art Ways, Hartford, Connecticut
 2016 Sea Garbage - The Athenaeum, St. Johnsbury, Vermont
 2017 Tomorrow, when Things Have Calmed Down - Hopkins School, New Haven, Connecticut
 2017 Facades - NHLC, New Haven, Connecticut
 2017 HOMELAND inSECURITY - Lanoue Gallery, Boston, Massachusetts
 2017 Critical Refuge - Whitney Humanities Center, Yale University, New Haven, Connecticut
 2017 UNPACKED: Refugee Baggage - Art Space, New Haven, Connecticut
 2017 Desperate Cargo - Greenwich Academy, Greenwich, Connecticut
 2017 UNPACKED: Refugee Baggage - UNICEF House, New York City, New York
 2018 Damascene Memories - Higgins Gallery, Clark University Worcester, Massachusetts
 2018 Collateral Damage - Fairfield Art Museum, Walsh Gallery, Fairfield, Connecticut
 2018 UNPACKED: Refugee Baggage - Christian Petersen Museum, Iowa State University, Ames, Iowa
 2019 HOMELAND inSECURITY - Cullis Wade Depot Art Gallery, Mississippi State University, Mississippi
 2019 UNPACKED: Refugee Baggage - The Juilliard School, New York City, New York
 2019 HOMELAND inSECURITY - Westover School, Middlebury, Connecticut
 2019 UNPACKED: Refugee Baggage - Harris School of Public Policy, University of Chicago, Illinois
 2019 UNPACKED: Refugee Baggage - Cullis Wade Depot Art Gallery, Mississippi State University, Mississippi
 2019 Retrospective - Miossi Gallery at Cuesta College, San Luis Obispo, California

Selected group exhibitions
2018 Syria, Then and Now: Stories from Refugees a century apart - Brooklyn Museum, Brooklyn, New York

References

External links
 Official website

Living people
1984 births
20th-century Syrian artists
21st-century Syrian artists